Colexification, together with its associated verb colexify, are terms used in semantics and lexical typology. It refers to the case when a language expresses different meanings using the same word.

Definition
Colexification describes the case when different meanings can be expressed by the same word (i.e., “co-lexified”) in a language. For example, the two senses which are distinguished in English as people and village are colexified in Spanish, which uses pueblo in both cases.

Colexification is meant as a neutral, descriptive term that avoids distinguishing between vagueness, polysemy, and homonymy. Some cases of colexification are common across the world (e.g. ‘blue’ = ‘green’); others are typical of certain linguistic and cultural areas (e.g. ‘tree’ = ‘fire’ among Papuan and Australian languages).

The opposite of “co-lexify” is “dis-lexify”, i.e. 'express two meanings using different lexical forms'. Thus, while Russian colexifies 'arm' and 'hand' using the single word рука, Spanish dislexifies these two meanings using two distinct words, respectively brazo v. mano.

Examples of colexification

Use in linguistic studies
 The term was coined by linguist Alexandre François in his 2008 article “Semantic maps and the typology of colexification”. This article illustrated the notion with various examples, including the semantic domains of {  }, {  }, {  }. The latter notion is at the source of a colexification network that is attested in several languages, linking together such senses as ‘breath’, ‘life’, ‘soul’, ‘spirit’, ‘ghost’...: Skr. आत्मन् ātmán; Anc. Gk ψυχή, πνεῦμα; Lat. animus, spīritus; Arab. روح rūḥ, etc. François built on this example to propose a method for constructing lexical semantic maps.

Several studies have taken up the concept of colexification, applying it to different semantic domains and various language families.

Colexification is also the object of a dedicated database known as CLiCS “Database of Cross-Linguistic Colexifications”. Based on data from more than 2400 language varieties of the world, the database makes it possible to check the typological frequency of individual instances of colexification, and to visualize semantic networks based on empirical data from the world's languages.

See also
Onomasiology
Ontology
Polysemy
Synonymy
Semantic change
Semantic maps

Notes

Bibliography
.
 
 Gast, Volker & Maria Koptjevskaja-Tamm. 2018. The areal factor in lexical typology. In D. Olmen, T. Mortelmans & F. Brisard (eds), Aspects of linguistic variation, 43–82. Berlin: DeGruyter.
 Georgakopoulos, Thanasis, Daniel A. Werning, Jörg Hartlieb, Tomoki Kitazumi, Lidewij van de Peut, Annette Sundermeyer & Gaëlle Chantrain. 2016. The meaning of ancient words for ‘earth’: An exercise in visualizing colexification on a semantic map. In Gerd Graßhoff & Michael Meyer (eds), Space and Knowledge. Special issue of eTopoi. Journal for Ancient Studies 6. 418–452.
 
 Juvonen, Päivi & Maria Koptjevskaja-Tamm. 2016. The Lexical Typology of Semantic Shifts (Cognitive Linguistics Research 58). Berlin: Walter de Gruyter.
 
 Pericliev, Vladimir. 2015. On colexification among basic vocabulary. Journal of Universal Language 16(2). 63–93. .
 
 Schapper, Antoinette, Lila San Roque & Rachel Hendery. 2016. Tree, firewood and fire in the languages of Sahul. In Päivi Juvonen & Maria Koptjevskaja-Tamm (eds.), The Lexical Typology of Semantic Shifts. Berlin, Boston: De Gruyter.
 Urban, Matthias. 2012. Analyzability and semantic associations in referring expressions. Leiden University PhD dissertation.

External links
 CLiCS “Database of Cross-Linguistic Colexifications”.

Lexical semantics
Polysemy
Homonymy